Ongjin County may refer to:

 Ongjin County, Incheon, South Korea
 Ongjin County, South Hwanghae, North Korea